The Expeditionary Service Award is an award of the United States Department of State.  It is presented to employees in the Department who serve in designated field locations.  Currently, the following locations have been designated expeditionary by the Director General of the Foreign Service:
Iraq
Afghanistan

The award consists of a certificate signed by the Secretary and a lapel pin.  There is no cash award associated with recognition.

Nominating and Approval Procedures
The Assistant Secretary of a regional bureau may seek approval to present the Expeditionary Service Award to State Department employees who meet the award's criteria of a year’s assignment with successful service, to arduous and difficult field locations.  The regional bureau will identify eligible field locations where State Department employees work and live in exceptionally difficult circumstances.  The bureau also sees that a suitable citation is drafted for the Secretary’s approval.  The awards committee or approving official will vet the recipients through the Office of the Inspector General, Office of Investigations, before the award is approved.

Military Use

As a civilian award, it is not issued to active-duty military personnel.

References

See also 
Awards of the United States Department of State
Awards and decorations of the United States government
United States Department of State
U.S. Foreign Service

Awards and decorations of the United States Department of State
United States Department of State